Rav Nachman bar Yaakov (died 320) was a Jewish Talmudist who lived in Babylonia, known as an Amora of the third generation. He was the husband of Yalta.

It is generally accepted that references to Rav Nachman in the Talmud refer to Rav Nachman bar Yaakov, not to Rav Nachman bar Yitzchak.

Biography
He was a student of Samuel of Nehardea and Rabbah bar Abuha. He served as chief justice of the Jews who were subject to the exilarch (the political head of the Babylonian Jewish community), and was also head of the school of Nehardea. On the destruction of that town, he transferred his pupils to Shekanẓib.

His marriage with the daughter of the wealthy exilarch enabled him to live in luxury and to entertain scholars and strangers lavishly. Thus Rabbi Yitzchak of Palestine, who visited Babylon, stayed at Rav Nachman's house and enjoyed his hospitality. When the guest, upon leaving, was asked by his host to bless him, the former answered with the beautiful parable of the tree which sheltered the weary traveler beneath its shade and fed him with its fruit, so that the grateful wanderer blessed it with the words, "How can I bless you? If I say that your fruit should be sweet, they are already sweet; that your shade should be pleasant, it is already pleasant; that the aqueduct should pass below you, it already passes below you. Rather, may all the saplings which are planted for you be like you." Similarly, Rav Nachman already possessed Torah, wealth, and children; so Rav Yitzchak blessed him that his offspring also be like him.

Rav Nachman had such a sense of his own worth that he said: "If some one now living were to become the Messiah, he must resemble me." He also permitted himself, in his capacity of justice, to decide civil cases without consulting his colleagues. When rabbis whom he considered inferior in learning opposed his rulings, he did not hesitate to label them as "children".

Teachings 
He was the source of a number of important halakhic principles. For example, he was the author of the ruling that a defendant who absolutely denies his guilt must take the so-called rabbinical oath "shevu'at hesset". He also formulated the accepted understanding of avad inish dina lenafsheih ("a man may carry out judgment for himself"), according to which in certain monetary cases, a person may "take the law into his hands" and do certain actions to protect his property at the expense of another's, even before a court has ruled on the matter.

Rav Nachman used many collections of aggadot. He was fond of collecting in one passage a number of Aramaic aphorisms, and used sturdy popular expressions in his speech. His aggadic remarks relating to Biblical personages were likewise made in this style, as the following specimens show:
It is not seemly for women to be conceited; the two prophetesses Deborah and Huldah had hateful names, namely, 'bee' and 'weasel'.
Impudence is effective even towards Heaven; for initially it is written [that God told Balaam] "You shall not go with them", and later [after Balaam persisted in asking] it is written [that God said] "Rise up and go with them".
Sinful fancies are more injurious to man than the sin itself.

References

 It has the following bibliography:
Hamburger, R.B.T. ii.819 et seq.;
Bacher, Ag. Bab. Amor. pp. 79–83;
Seder ha-Dorot, pp. 283 et seq.

320 deaths
Talmud rabbis of Babylonia
Year of birth unknown